Erwin Erich Bauer (17 July 1912 in Stuttgart – 3 June 1958 in Cologne) was a German Formula One driver who raced a privately entered Veritas in his one World Championship Grand Prix.

Racing career
In April, 1953, Bauer co-drove a Porsche 356 Super 1500 with Hans Herrmann at the Mille Miglia. They finished the race in the 30th position.

Bauer became famous for racing an undermatched Lotus to a fourth place in the 1954 1000km Nürburgring, and thus, providing Lotus with one of its earliest successes. His sole race in the Formula One World Championship came in 1953 at the German Grand Prix at the Nürburgring. In a field of thirty four, Bauer qualified 33rd, only ahead of fellow Veritas entrant Oswald Karch. He made it onto the second lap, which was more than could be said for Hans Stuck and Ernst Loof, but then his engine expired. He had jumped up to 28th, leaping ahead of the two retiring cars plus Rudolf Krause and Maurice Trintignant.

Death
Five years later, again at the Nürburgring racetrack, he was killed in a 2-litre sports Ferrari where, not realising he had passed the chequered flag, kept on racing and crashed fatally on what was supposed to be his slowing-down lap.

Complete Formula One results
(key)

References 

1912 births
1958 deaths
24 Hours of Le Mans drivers
German Formula One drivers
German racing drivers
Sportspeople from Stuttgart
Racing drivers from Baden-Württemberg
Racing drivers who died while racing
Sport deaths in Germany